Codex Bodmer XIX is a Coptic uncial manuscript of the four Gospels, dated palaeographically to the 4th or 5th century. It contains the text of the Gospel of Matthew 14:28-28:20; Epistle to the Romans 1:1-2:3. It is written in the Sahidic dialect of the Coptic language. 

The two books are paginated separately in the codex. According to Kasser four scribes worked on the manuscript: one wrote the text of Matthew, one who wrote the text of Romans, and two later correctors.

The text of the codex is a representative of the Alexandrian text-type. 

It was published by Rodolphe Kasser in 1962.

The manuscript is currently housed at the Bibliotheca Bodmeriana (P. Bodmer XIX) in Cologny along with other manuscripts from the Bodmer Papyri.

See also 

 List of the Coptic New Testament manuscripts
 Coptic versions of the Bible
 Biblical manuscript

References

Further reading 
 Rodolphe Kasser, Papyrus Bodmer XIX, Évangile de Matthieu XIV, 28-XXVIII, 20, Épître aux Romains I. 1-II.3 en sahidique (Cologny-Geneva, 1962). 

Coptic New Testament manuscripts
4th-century biblical manuscripts